The following are the  events of 1887 in association football.

Events

Clubs founded in 1887

La Plata GFC

Odense BK

Athlone Town

Barnsley
Blackpool
Cheltenham Town F.C.
Lowesoft Town
Weston-super-Mare
Witton Albion
Wycombe Wanderers

Hamburger SV

Academica

Örgryte IS

Domestic cups

International tournaments 
 1887 British Home Championship (February 5 – March 19, 1887)

 1887 Football World Championship (April 9, 1887)

Births 
 30 April – Harold Fleming (d. 1955), England international forward in eleven matches (1909–1914), scoring nine goals.
 7 November – Guus van Hecking Colenbrander (d. 1945), Netherlands international (1908).

References 

 
Association football by year